Subarnapur is a village development committee in Parsa District in the Narayani Zone of southern Nepal. At the time of the 2011 Nepal census it had a population of 3,452 people living in 774 individual households. There were 1,582 males and 1,870 females at the time of census.

References

Populated places in Parsa District